Popcornflix LLC is a website and over-the-top (OTT) service offering free ad-supported streaming video of feature-length movies and webisodes and owned by the Screen Media Ventures subsidiary of Chicken Soup for the Soul Entertainment.

History
Popcornflix was conceived in July 2010, and went into live beta in March 2011. The site primarily streams independent feature films, many of which come from Screen Media's library. 
The service is accessible in the United States and Canada, with plans to launch in more territories. 
In 2017, Popcornflix's owner, Screen Media Ventures, was acquired by Chicken Soup for the Soul Entertainment.

Platforms
Popcornflix is available on the following platforms:
 Popcornflix.com (web based access)
 Roku
 Amazon Fire TV
 Xbox 360
 Xbox One
 Xbox Series X/S
 Apple TV
 iPhone
 iPad
 iPod Touch
 Android TV
 Chromecast
 PlayStation 3
 PlayStation 4
 PlayStation 5
 Kodi

Programming
In addition to full-length independent movies, Popcornflix features original content including web series and film school originals. 
The service is accessible in the United States and Canada, with plans to launch in more territories.

References

External links
 

Advertising video on demand